Stephen Michael Shemo (April 9, 1915 – April 13, 1992) was a Major League Baseball second baseman who played for the Boston Braves in 1944 and 1945.

Shemo is one of many ballplayers who only appeared in the major leagues during World War II.  He made his major league debut on April 18, 1944 (Opening Day) against the New York Giants at the Polo Grounds.  His last game for Boston was on July 16, 1945.  A few days later, he was traded to the Indianapolis Indians of the minor league American Association, and never again returned to the major leagues.

Shemo's career totals included 35 games played, a .260 batting average (20-for-77), eight runs batted in, and seven runs scored.  He appeared in more games at second base than at third base, but fielded better at third.

Shemo died at the age of 77 in Eden, North Carolina.

External links

Retrosheet

1915 births
1992 deaths
People from Swoyersville, Pennsylvania
Baseball players from Pennsylvania
Major League Baseball second basemen
Boston Braves players
Hartford Laurels players
Indianapolis Indians players
Jersey City Giants players
Mayodan Millers players
Oklahoma City Indians players
Richmond Colts players
Springfield Rifles players
Winston-Salem Cardinals players